Reza-Qoli Khan Hedayat (8 June 1800 – 29 June 1871) was a Persian literary historian, administrator, and poet in 19th-century Qajar Iran.

Biography
Hedayat was born in Tehran on 8 June 1800 to a renowned family which was descended from the prominent 14th-century lyric-poet Kamal Khujandi. In his autobiographical work, Hedayat sometimes refers to himself as "Hedayat Mazan-darani", "Tabari", or "Tabarestani" due to his father Mohammad-Hadi Khan having served in the entourage of the Qajar tribal leaders in Mazandaran. Upon the completion of his education, he entered the service of Prince Hossein Ali Mirza Farman Farma son of Fat'h Ali Shah and governor of Shiraz. He was given the title of Khan and of Amir-ol Sho'ara in 1830, when Fath Ali Shah visited Shiraz.

In 1838 he came back to Tehran. Mohammed Shah instructed him to remain at the court and in 1841 selected him as tutor to his son Prince Abbas Mirza Molk Ara. In 1847 he was appointed governor of Firuzkuh.

In 1851, he was chosen by Naser al-Din Shah to lead the Embassy to Khiva. He was minister of education in 1852 and principal of the newly founded Dar-ol-fonoon College at Tehran.

In 1857, he was selected as tutor of Mozaffar al-Din Shah.

He died from a severe illness in 1871. He has two sons, Ali Qoli Khan Mokhber ed-Dowleh and Ja'afar Qoli Khan Nayer-ol-Molk. Reza Qoli Khan was great-grandfather of Sadeq Hedayat.

Works
Farhang-e anjomanārā-ye nāṣeri (a Persian dictionary)
Madārej al-balāḡa dar ʿElm-e Badiʿ (on Persian rhetoric)
Majmaʿ al-foṣaḥā ("The meeting place of the eloquent")
Rawżat al-ṣafā-ye nāṣeri
Riāż al-ʿārefin ("The gardens of the Mystics")
Tārix-e Rawżat al-ṣafā-ye nāṣeri (on history)

He also wrote a Divan containing 50,000 distichs and six Mathnawis.

References

Sources 
 

Hedayat, Reza Qoli Khan
Hedayat, Reza Qoli Khan
1800 births
Persian-language poets
19th-century Persian-language writers
Iranian governors
19th-century poets
Iranian biographers
People from Mazandaran Province
People of Qajar Iran